Arrenodes is a genus of beetles belonging to the family Brentidae.

The species of this genus are found in Northern America.

Species:

Arrenodes angulicollis
Arrenodes minutus

References

Brentidae